Water supply and sanitation in Macau refers to the water supply network in Macau, China.

Regulator
Water supply-related affairs is managed by Macao Water.

Production
As of 2016, the total installed design daily water supply capacity in Macau was 390,000 m3 with peak daily demand of 297,600 m3.

Infrastructure

Water supply infrastructures in Macau consist of reservoirs, raw water pumping stations, water treatment plants and treated water pumping stations.

Reservoirs
 Main Storage Reservoir
 Seac Pai Van Reservoir
 Ka Ho Reservoir
 Guia 50m Elevated Treated Water Tank
 Guia 70m Elevated Treated Water Tank
 Taipa 50m Elevated Treated Water Tank
 Taipa 70m Elevated Treated Water Tank

Water treatment plants
 Ilha Verde Water Treatment Plant
 Main Storage Reservoir Water Treatment Plant
 Coloane Water Treatment Plant

Pumping stations

Raw water pumping stations
 Jai Alai Raw Water Pumping Station
 Main Storage Reservoir Raw Water Pumping Station
 Seac Pai Van Raw Water Pumping Station
 Ka Ho Raw Water Pumping Station

Treated water pumping stations
 Ilha Verde Water Pumping Station
 Main Storage Reservoir Pumping Station
 Guia 50m Pumping Station
 Taipa 50m Pumping Station
 Sai Van Pumping Station
 Seac Pai Van Booster Pumping Station
 Floral Garden Pumping Station

References

Water in Macau